Alexandra Ward is a ward in the central area of Ipswich, Suffolk, England. It returns three councillors to Ipswich Borough Council.

It is designated Middle Layer Super Output Area Ipswich 007 by the Office of National Statistics. It is composed of 6 Lower Layer Super Output Areas.

Ward profile, 2008
Alexandra Ward is located in Ipswich town centre. In 2005 it had a population a little under 7,500. A high proportion of its residents living alone and it also has a high proportion of younger people.

Notable buildings in Alexandra Ward
 Neptune Inn, Fore Street

Churches
 St Clement's Church
 St Lawrence Church
 St Mary at the Elms

Councillors
The following councillors were elected since the boundaries were changed in 2002 Names in brackets indicates that the councillor remained in office without re-election.

References

 
Wards of Ipswich